Dan Margalit (born March 6, 1976) is an American mathematician at the Georgia Institute of Technology. His research fields include geometric group theory and low-dimensional topology, with a particular focus on mapping class groups of surfaces.

Education and career
Margalit earned his bachelor's degree from Brown University. He earned his doctorate from the University of Chicago in 2003, advised by Benson Farb.  His thesis was titled Algebra versus Topology in Mapping Class Groups. Margalit was a postdoctoral scholar at the University of Utah from 2003 to 2008.  He was a faculty member at Tufts University from 2008 to 2010, before moving to the Georgia Institute of Technology.

Margalit is known for his work in exposition of geometric group theory, particularly his book with Benson Farb, A Primer on Mapping Class Groups.

Awards and honors
Margalit became a fellow of the American Mathematical Society in 2019; he was recognized "for contributions to low-dimensional topology and geometric group theory, exposition, and mentoring."  Margalit was a 2009 Sloan Research Fellow.  For 2021 he received the Levi L. Conant Prize of the AMS.

Selected publications
Books

  
Translations

References 

1976 births
Living people
21st-century American mathematicians
Tufts University faculty
Georgia Tech faculty
Brown University alumni
University of Chicago alumni
Fellows of the American Mathematical Society
Sloan Research Fellows
Topologists
Group theorists